Brockmoor Halt was a small railway stop on the Wombourne Branch Line in West Midlands, England. It had very poor patronage and, along with the rest of the line's passenger stations, was closed just seven years after its introduction by the Great Western Railway in 1925. The halt served the settlement of Brockmoor, which is now part of the Brierley Hill area.

Brierley Hill railway station was closer to Brockmoor's small High Street than the halt named after it. Brockmoor Halt remains in place with the platforms and single rail including the bridge to Kingswinford Junction but it has been fenced off and mothballed since 1994.

References

Further reading

Disused railway stations in Dudley
Former Great Western Railway stations
Railway stations in Great Britain opened in 1925
Railway stations in Great Britain closed in 1932